Battle of Mansurah may refer to:

Battle of Mansurah (1221), during the Fifth Crusade
Battle of Mansurah (1250), during the Seventh Crusade
Air battle of Mansoura (1973), during the Yom Kippur War